Scott Allen Mruczkowski [merch-COW-ski] (born April 5, 1982) is a former American football center. He was drafted by the San Diego Chargers in the seventh round of the 2005 NFL Draft and played for the team for seven seasons. He played college football at Bowling Green.

External links
San Diego Chargers bio

1982 births
Living people
People from Garfield Heights, Ohio
Players of American football from Ohio
American football centers
American football offensive guards
American people of Polish descent
Bowling Green Falcons football players
San Diego Chargers players
Sportspeople from Cuyahoga County, Ohio